Lindores Abbey was a Tironensian abbey on the outskirts of Newburgh in Fife, Scotland.

The abbey was founded as a daughter house of Kelso Abbey in 1191 (some sources say 1178), by David, Earl of Huntingdon, on land granted to him by his brother William the Lion. The first abbot was Guido, Prior of Kelso, under whom the buildings were mostly completed. Edward I of England, John Balliol, David II, and James III were among the monarchs who visited Lindores at different times. The Abbey ceased operation in 1559.

The Lindores Abbey distillery re-opened in 2017 and began distilling scotch whisky by December of that year. It is operated by the McKenzie Smith family.

History 

David Stewart, Duke of Rothesay, who died during imprisonment at Falkland Palace in 1402, was buried at the Abbey.

The abbey was sacked by a mob from Dundee in 1543, and again by John Knox and his supporters in 1559. According to one report, they "overthrew the altars, broke up statues, burned the books and vestments and made them cast aside their monkish habits".

After the Reformation, the Abbey passed into the hands of a Commendator, one whose loyal service to the King was rewarded by the gift of the ecclesiastical income and property. The monks remained for a time, but the Abbey began to be dismantled around 1584. In the following years the Abbey buildings were quarried as a source of building stone for Newburgh, and slate, timber and carvings from the Abbey as well as a number of architectural fragments are visible built into later structures in the town. When Patrick Leslie was Commendator, in August 1595, Anne of Denmark met the Earl of Orkney at Lindores .

The main upstanding remains of the Abbey are: one of the gateways leading into the monastic enclosure; the groin-vaulted slype, leading from the cloister garth to the exterior of the Abbey; and parts of the chancel walls and western tower of the church, although the ground plan of the whole structure can still be traced.  Sections of the imposing precinct wall which once enclosed the abbey can also be seen in fields to the south.

Carved wooden panels from the Abbey of the early 16th century survive in the Laing Museum, Newburgh and, reset in a 19th-century cabinet, in St. Paul's Episcopal Cathedral, Dundee.

The earliest record of scotch whisky in the exchequer roll for 1494 is a payment from King James IV to Friar John Cor of Lindores Abbey for about "eight bols of malt" or 580 kg of aquavitae as it was then known. Brother John Cor (Johanni Cor/John Kawe) was a Tironensian monk based at Lindores Abbey.

The monks distilled rose water at the Abbey, and in May 1540 rosewater and apples from Lindores were sent to James V.

In 2018 a distillation vat was discovered in the ruins, along with evidence of whisky production. The remains of the still are preserved for display in the ruins.

Lindores Abbey distillery 
A whisky distillery, Lindores Abbey distillery is directly opposite the Abbey.

Burials
James Douglas, 9th Earl of Douglas
David Stewart, Duke of Rothesay
 Robert and Henry, infant sons of David I, Earl of Huntingdon

See also
 Abbot of Lindores, for a list of abbots and commendators
 National Archives of Scotland for the exchequer roll

References

External links

 Lindores Abbey Distillery website
Tour Lindores Abbey.
Divine Inspiration. The Scotsman. 24 January 2004

Lindores Abbey - Home of Scotch Whisky. 1 October 2011
 Entry for Lindores Abbey in Canmore database.

Listed monasteries in Scotland
Tironensian monasteries
Christian monasteries established in the 12th century
Religion in Fife
History of Fife
Scheduled Ancient Monuments in Fife
Tourist attractions in Fife
Ruins in Fife
Ruined abbeys and monasteries
Former Christian monasteries in Scotland